Lee Yong-chan (Hangul: 이용찬, Hanja: 李庸燦) (born January 2, 1989) is a South Korean relief pitcher for the NC Dinos of the KBO League. He bats and throws right-handed.

Amateur career
Lee attended Jangchung High School in Seoul, South Korea. In 2006, he was selected for the South Korea national junior team that won the gold medal at the World Junior Baseball Championship in Cuba. Lee came on in relief and hurled three inning no-hitter with six strikeouts in a 9–0 victory over South Africa. He started Team Korea's fourth game of the round robin phase against Cuba, but allowed six runs and seven hits in just three innings.

Professional career
Upon graduation from Jangchung High School in 2007, Lee join the Doosan Bears, selected in the first round of the 2007 KBO Draft. However, he was sidelined the entire season after undergoing elbow surgery.

Lee was added to the 26-man first team roster of the Bears in the start of 2008 season, and posted a solid 1.23 ERA with 12 strikeouts, allowing two earned runs in eight games in April. On April 30, Lee earned his first professional win over the Kia Tigers, coming on relief and pitching 2.1 scoreless innings with two strikeouts. However, he was again placed on the disabled list in May when his elbow symptoms returned during a game, and didn't come up to the first team roster until the end of the season.

Lee had his best season as a closer in 2009 when he led the KBO league with a league-leading 26 saves, appearing in 51 games. He was regarded as an unconventional closer, however, as he didn't overwhelm hitters. Despite 19 saves and a 3.00 ERA before the All-Star break, he struggled the second half of the season when his ERA jumped to 4.98. Lee managed to rebound nicely from the slump in September, the final month of season, hurling 6.1 scoreless innings and racking 3 saves, but his final ERA (4.20) was the second-highest among the Top 10 closers of the 2009 KBO league.

Lee picked up his first save of the 2010 season on March 28 against the Kia Tigers and soon became the league's leading closer. He saved 11 consecutive games before he suffered his first blown save of the season on May 19 against the Hanwha Eagles. On September 6, 2010, Lee was arrested in Apgujeong-dong, Seoul on drunk driving charges after the police caught him in hit-and-run crash. He was pulled over and took a Breathalyzer test, which he failed. He was charged with misdemeanor driving while intoxicated. The Bears suspended him indefinitely later that day when media reports of the arrest surfaced.

International career
He represented South Korea at the 2018 Asian Games.

References

External links 

1989 births
Living people
Baseball players at the 2018 Asian Games
Asian Games gold medalists for South Korea
Medalists at the 2018 Asian Games
Asian Games medalists in baseball
Doosan Bears players
KBO League pitchers
KBO League Rookie of the Year Award winners
South Korean baseball players
Baseball players from Seoul
2023 World Baseball Classic players